Diana Mae Magtoto "Tots" Carlos (born July 7, 1998) is a Filipino volleyball player who currently plays for the Creamline Cool Smashers. She was playing with UP Lady Fighting Maroons of the University of the Philippines-Diliman, and a member of both the indoor and beach volleyball collegiate varsity teams of the university. She bagged the back-to-back Most Valuable Player and Best Opposite Spiker in the 2022 Premier Volleyball League Open Conference and 2022 Premier Volleyball League Invitational Conference. She is also part of the Philippines women's national volleyball team that competes in the 2022 Asian Women's Volleyball Cup.

Career
Tots Carlos, a Pampanga-native volleybelle, was one of the hottest recruits to play in the UAAP Season 78. Aside from UP she was also being recruited by other UAAP teams of DLSU, Adamson and FEU. She won the Palarong Pambansa Best Blocker award before entering college at the University of the Philippines-Diliman, she is currently playing for the UP Fighting Lady Maroons. She helped her collegiate team enter the Final Four in the UAAP Season 78, and helped the team win two bronze medal finishes in the Shakey's V-League. Carlos is known for her versatility, she was a Middle Blocker in High School before she was converted to an Opposite Hitter, and later on to an Outside Hitter for the Lady Maroons. Carlos won the Inquirer 7 - Week 2 Top 7 and Week 3 Top 1 Player from the UAAP.

At the age of 18, she was recruited to play for the Perlas Spikers in the Premier Volleyball League 1st Season Reinforced Open Conference. For two consecutive years, she was picked to join the Premier Volleyball League All-Star. In 2016, she helped Team Palaban defeat Team Puso. In 2017, she top-scored Team Roger to defeat Team Rico where she bagged the 2017 PVL Best Player of the All-Stars award. She is also a member of the UP Fighting Maroons Women's Beach Volleyball Team, where she and Arielle Estrañero bagged the bronze for the Lady Maroons.

In 2018, Carlos was awarded as the 1st Best Outside Spiker and the Most Valuable Player in the 2018 PSL Collegiate Grand Slam Conference after her return from shin injury.

In 2019, Carlos lead the Motolite team in its inaugural semis run for the 2019 PVL Open Conference as the league's 2nd highest scorer. She was eventually elected as the Best Opposite of the tournament. In 2021, she is set to sign with Creamline Cool Smashers for the first season of Premier Volleyball League on its professional status.

Clubs
  Perlas Lady Spikers (2017)
  Foton Tornadoes (2018)
  Motolite Power Builders (2019–2020)
  Creamline Cool Smashers (2021-present)

Awards

Individuals
2015 Palarong Pambansa "Best Blocker"
2018 PSL Collegiate Grand Slam Conference "1st Best Outside Spiker"
2018 PSL Collegiate Grand Slam Conference "Most Valuable Player"
2019 PVL Open Conference "Best Opposite Spiker"
2022 PVL Open Conference "Best Opposite Spiker"
2022 PVL Open Conference "Conference Most Valuable Player"
2022 PVL Invitational Conference "Best Opposite Spiker"
2022 PVL Invitational Conference "Conference Most Valuable Player"

Collegiate
 2015 Shakey's V-League 12th Season Reinforced Open Conference –  Bronze medal, with UP Fighting Lady Maroons
 2016 Shakey's V-League 13th Season Collegiate Conference –  Bronze medal, with UP Fighting Lady Maroons
 2016 Founders'  Cup Philippines –   Champion, with UP Fighting Lady Maroons
 2017 Founders'  Cup Philippines –   Champion, with UP Fighting Lady Maroons
 2017 UAAP Season 80 Beach Volleyball –  Bronze medal, with UP Fighting Lady Maroons
 2018 PSL Collegiate Grand Slam Conference –   Champion, with UP Fighting Lady Maroons

Club
 2018 Philippine Superliga Grand Prix –  Bronze medal, with Foton Tornadoes
 2021 Premier Volleyball League Open Conference –  Runner-up with Creamline Cool Smashers
 2022 Premier Volleyball League Open Conference –  Champion, with Creamline Cool Smashers
 2022 Premier Volleyball League Invitational Conference –  Champion, with Creamline Cool Smashers
 2022 Premier Volleyball League Reinforced Conference -  Bronze medal, with Creamline Cool Smashers

References 

1998 births
Living people
Filipino women's volleyball players
Women's beach volleyball players
University Athletic Association of the Philippines volleyball players
Volleyball players from Pampanga
Outside hitters
Opposite hitters
University of the Philippines Diliman alumni
Philippines women's international volleyball players